A barcode printer is a computer peripheral for printing barcode labels or tags that can be attached to, or printed directly on, physical objects. Barcode printers are commonly used to label cartons before shipment, or to label retail items with UPCs or EANs.

The most common barcode printers employ one of two different printing technologies.  Direct thermal printers use a printhead to generate heat that causes a chemical reaction in specially designed paper that turns the paper black. Thermal transfer printers also use heat, but instead of reacting the paper, the heat melts a waxy or resin substance on a ribbon that runs over the label or tag material.  The heat transfers ink from the ribbon to the paper.  Direct thermal printers are generally less expensive, but they produce labels that can become illegible if exposed to heat, direct sunlight, or chemical vapors.

Barcode printers are designed for different markets.  Industrial barcode printers are used in large warehouses and manufacturing facilities.  They have large paper capacities, operate faster and have a longer service life.  For retail and office environments, desktop barcode printers are most common.

See also
Computer printer
Label printer

References

External links

Printer
Computer printers
Automatic identification and data capture
Packaging machinery